Pella is a railway station located in Otradnoye (suburb of Saint Petersburg), Russia. It opened in 1911 and is 36 km from the Moskovsky railway station.

There is another railway station within the city: Ivanovskaya railway station.

Gallery

References 

Railway stations in the Russian Empire opened in 1911
Railway stations in Saint Petersburg Railway Division